Atractus emigdioi, also known commonly as Emigdio's ground snake, is a species of snake in the family Colubridae. The species is endemic to Venezuela.

Etymology
The specific name, emigdioi, is in honor of Emigdio González-Sponga who collected the holotype.

Geographic range
A. emigdioi is found in the Cordillera de Mérida in the Venezuelan states of Mérida and Trujillo.

Habitat

Behavior
A. emigdioi is terrestrial and semifossorial (Schargel & Castoe, 2003).

Reproduction
A. emigdioi is oviparous.

References

Further reading
Esqueda LF, La Marca E (2005). "Revisión taxonómica y biogeográfica (con descripción de cinco nuevas especies) de serpientes del género Atractus (Colubridae: Dipsadinae) en los Ande de Venezuela". Herpetotropicos 2 (1): 1–32. (in Spanish, with an abstract in English).
González-Sponga MA (1971). "Atractus emigdioi (Serpentes: Colubridae) nueva especie para los Andes de Venezuela". Monografías Cientificas Augusto Pi Suñer, Instituto Pedagógico de Caracas (3): 1–11. (Atractus emigdioi, new species). (in Spanish).
Schargel WE, Castoe TA (2003). "The Hemipenes of Some Snakes of the Semifossorial Genus Atractus, with Comments on Variation in the Genus". Journal of Herpetology 37 (4): 718–721.

Atractus
Reptiles of Venezuela
Endemic fauna of Venezuela
Reptiles described in 1971